Henry Purkitt Kidder (January 18, 1823 – January 28, 1886) was an American bank founder born in Cambridge, Massachusetts.

Early life
Kidder was born on January 18, 1823, in Cambridge, Massachusetts. His parents were Thomas Kidder, a Boston civil servant in charge of meat and fish inspection, and the former Clarissa Purkitt.

Kidder was educated at Boston English High School.

Career
In 1838, he became a clerk in a grocery store, and at age 18, became a clerk in the office of Coolidge & Haskell.  In 1847, Kidder joined J.E. Thayer & Brother, where he learned banking.

In April 1865, Kidder, Francis H. Peabody, and Oliver W. Peabody, all of whom had previously worked as clerks at J.E. Thayer & Brother, established Kidder, Peabody & Co., via reorganization of J.E. Thayer & Brother.  In 1886, Kidder, Peabody became the agents of the London bank, Baring Brothers.

Personal life
Kidder served on several charitable boards.

Kidder died on January 28, 1886, in New York City.

References

External links
Scriptophily: History of Kidder Peabody

1823 births
1886 deaths
American bankers
19th-century American businesspeople